This is a list of current and former BBC shows that have been released as podcasts. The podcasts have been arranged in tables according to genre.

Original Podcasts

True Crime

Life Stories

History

Investigative journalism

References 

BBC
BBC-related lists